This is a list of the species in the genus Calosoma, caterpillar hunters.

Calosoma species
These 164 species belong to the genus Calosoma:

 Calosoma abbreviatum Chaudoir, 1869
 Calosoma abyssinicum Gestro, 1881
 Calosoma aethiopicum Breuning, 1927
 Calosoma affine Chaudoir, 1843
 Calosoma algiricum Géhin, 1885
 Calosoma alinderi Breuning, 1928
 Calosoma alternans (Fabricius, 1792)
 Calosoma ampliator Bates, 1891
 Calosoma angulatum Chevrolat, 1834
 Calosoma anthracinum Dejean, 1831
 Calosoma anthrax Semenov, 1900
 Calosoma antinorii Gestro, 1878
 Calosoma argentinense Csiki, 1927
 Calosoma arrowi Breuning, 1928
 Calosoma atrovirens Chaudoir, 1869
 Calosoma aurocinctum Chaudoir, 1850
 Calosoma auropunctatum (Herbst, 1784)
 Calosoma bastardi Alluaud, 1925
 Calosoma beesoni Andrewes, 1919
 Calosoma blaptoides Putzeys, 1845
 Calosoma brachycerum (Gerstaecker, 1884)
 Calosoma breviusculum (Mannerheim, 1830)
 Calosoma bridgesi Chaudoir, 1869
 Calosoma bulleri Beheim & Breuning, 1943
 Calosoma burtoni Alluaud, 1913
 Calosoma calidum (Fabricius, 1775)
 Calosoma cancellatum Eschscholtz, 1833
 Calosoma catenatum (Roeschke, 1899)
 Calosoma chihuahua Gidaspow, 1959
 Calosoma chinense Kirby, 1819
 Calosoma chlorostictum Dejean, 1831
 Calosoma cicatricosum Chaudoir, 1869
 Calosoma costipenne Chaudoir, 1869
 Calosoma cyaneoventre Mandl, 1954
 Calosoma cyanescens Motschulsky, 1859
 Calosoma davidis Géhin, 1885
 Calosoma dawsoni (Dajoz, 1997)
 Calosoma deckeni (Gerstaecker, 1867)
 Calosoma denticolle Gebler, 1833
 Calosoma depressicolle Chaudoir, 1869
 Calosoma dietzii Schaeffer, 1904
 Calosoma digueti (Lapouge, 1924)
 Calosoma discors LeConte, 1857
 Calosoma elegans (Kirsch, 1859)
 Calosoma elgonense (Burgeon, 1928)
 Calosoma eremicola Fall, 1910
 Calosoma ewersmanni (Chaudoir, 1850)
 Calosoma externum (Say, 1823)
 Calosoma fabulosum Semenov & Znojko, 1933
 Calosoma fischeri (Fischer von Waldheim, 1842)
 Calosoma flohri Bates, 1884
 Calosoma frigidum Kirby, 1837
 Calosoma fulgens Chaudoir, 1869
 Calosoma galapageium Hope, 1838
 Calosoma gestroi Breuning, 1928
 Calosoma glabratum Dejean, 1831
 Calosoma glaciale (Kolbe, 1905)
 Calosoma granatense Géhin, 1885
 Calosoma grandidieri Maindron, 1900
 Calosoma guineense Imhoff, 1843
 Calosoma harrarense (Jakobson, 1900)
 Calosoma haydeni G.Horn, 1870
 Calosoma himalayanum Gestro, 1875
 Calosoma imbricatum Klug, 1832
 Calosoma indicum Hope, 1831
 Calosoma inquisitor (Linnaeus, 1758)
 Calosoma investigator (Illiger, 1798)
 Calosoma janssensi (Basilewsky, 1953)
 Calosoma kenyense Breuning, 1928
 Calosoma kuschakewitschi (Ballion, 1871)
 Calosoma laeve Dejean, 1826
 Calosoma laevigatum Chaudoir, 1869
 Calosoma lariversi Van Dyke, 1943
 Calosoma latipenne G.Horn, 1870
 Calosoma leleupi (Basilewsky, 1962)
 Calosoma leleuporum (Basilewsky, 1968)
 Calosoma lepidum LeConte, 1845
 Calosoma linelli Mutchler, 1925
 Calosoma lugens Chaudoir, 1869
 Calosoma luxatum Say, 1823
 Calosoma macrum LeConte, 1853
 Calosoma maderae (Fabricius, 1775)
 Calosoma marginale Casey, 1897
 Calosoma marginatum Gebler, 1830
 Calosoma masaicum (Alluaud, 1912)
 Calosoma maximoviczi A.Morawitz, 1863
 Calosoma mirificum (Casale, 1979)
 Calosoma moniliatum (LeConte, 1852)
 Calosoma monticola Casey, 1897
 Calosoma morelianum Bates, 1891
 Calosoma morrisonii G.Horn, 1885
 Calosoma neumanni (Kolbe, 1895)
 Calosoma nyassicum (Basilewsky, 1984)
 Calosoma oberthueri Vuillet, 1910
 Calosoma obsoletum Say, 1823
 Calosoma oceanicum Perroud & Montrouzier, 1864
 Calosoma olivieri Dejean, 1831
 Calosoma omiltemium Bates, 1891
 Calosoma oregonum (Gidaspow, 1959)
 Calosoma orientale Hope, 1833
 Calosoma orizabae (Jeannel, 1940)
 Calosoma palmeri G.Horn, 1876
 Calosoma panderi (Fischer von Waldheim, 1820)
 Calosoma parvicolle Fall, 1910
 Calosoma pentheri Apfelbeck, 1918
 Calosoma peregrinator Guérin-Méneville, 1844
 Calosoma persianum (Morvan, 1974)
 Calosoma peruviense Mandl, 1971
 Calosoma placerum (Gidaspow, 1959)
 Calosoma planicolle Chaudoir, 1869
 Calosoma politum Chaudoir, 1869
 Calosoma porosifrons Bates, 1891
 Calosoma prominens LeConte, 1853
 Calosoma protractum LeConte, 1862
 Calosoma raffrayi Fairmaire, 1883
 Calosoma regelianum A.Morawitz, 1886
 Calosoma reitteri Roeschke, 1897
 Calosoma relictum Apfelbeck, 1918
 Calosoma reticulatum (Fabricius, 1787)
 Calosoma retusum (Fabricius, 1775)
 Calosoma roeschkei Breuning, 1927
 Calosoma rufipenne Dejean, 1831
 Calosoma rugolosum Beheim & Breuning, 1943
 Calosoma sayi Dejean, 1826
 Calosoma scabrosum Chaudoir, 1843
 Calosoma schaefferi Breuning, 1928
 Calosoma schayeri Erichson, 1842
 Calosoma scrutator (Fabricius, 1775)
 Calosoma semilaeve LeConte, 1852
 Calosoma senegalense Dejean, 1831
 Calosoma simplex LeConte, 1878
 Calosoma splendidum Dejean, 1831
 Calosoma sponsa Casey, 1897
 Calosoma strandi Breuning, 1934
 Calosoma striatior Hatch, 1953
 Calosoma striatulum Chevrolat, 1835
 Calosoma subaeneum Chaudoir, 1869
 Calosoma subasperatum Schaeffer, 1915
 Calosoma sycophanta (Linnaeus, 1758)
 Calosoma tepidum LeConte, 1852
 Calosoma trapezipenne Chaudoir, 1869
 Calosoma usgentense Solsky, 1874
 Calosoma vagans Dejean, 1831
 Calosoma vermiculatum (Straneo, 1942)
 Calosoma viridissimum (Haury, 1880)
 Calosoma viridisulcatum Chaudoir, 1863
 Calosoma volkensi (Kolbe, 1895)
 Calosoma wilcoxi LeConte, 1847
 Calosoma wilkesii (LeConte, 1852)
 † Calosoma agassizii Oustalet, 1874
 † Calosoma brunneum Zhang; Liu & Shangguan, 1989
 † Calosoma calvini Wickham, 1909
 † Calosoma caraboides Heer, 1860
 † Calosoma catenulatum Heer, 1865
 † Calosoma ceresti Nel, 1989
 † Calosoma cockerelli Wickham, 1910
 † Calosoma deplanatum Heer, 1860
 † Calosoma emmonsii Scudder, 1900
 † Calosoma escheri Heer, 1860
 † Calosoma escrobiculatum Heer, 1860
 † Calosoma fernquisti Cockerell, 1924
 † Calosoma heeri Scudder, 1895
 † Calosoma jaccardi Heer, 1860
 † Calosoma nauckianum Heer, 1860

References

Calosoma